Jordan Edwards may refer to:

 Murder of Jordan Edwards (2001–2017), a 15-year-old African American boy murdered by a police officer
 Jordan Edwards (footballer) (born 1999), English footballer